Piotr Ianulov (born 27 February 1986) is a Moldovan freestyle wrestler. He is a silver medalist at both the European Games and European Wrestling Championships.

Career 

In 2015, at the European Games held in Baku, Azerbaijan, he won the silver medal in the 86 kg event. In the same year, he also competed in the men's freestyle 86 kg event at the 2015 World Wrestling Championships held in Las Vegas, United States where he was eliminated in his second match by Alireza Karimi of Iran.

At the 2019 European Wrestling Championships held in Bucharest, Romania, he won the silver medal in the 86 kg event. In the final, he lost against Vladislav Valiev of Russia. In 2020, he won one of the bronze medals in the men's 86 kg event at the 2020 Individual Wrestling World Cup held in Belgrade, Serbia. In March 2021, he competed at the European Qualification Tournament in Budapest, Hungary hoping to qualify for the 2020 Summer Olympics in Tokyo, Japan. He did not qualify at this tournament and he also failed to qualify for the Olympics at the World Olympic Qualification Tournament held in Sofia, Bulgaria.

Major results

References

External links 

 

Living people
1986 births
Place of birth missing (living people)
Moldovan male sport wrestlers
Wrestlers at the 2015 European Games
European Games silver medalists for Moldova
European Games medalists in wrestling
Universiade medalists in wrestling
Universiade bronze medalists for Moldova
European Wrestling Championships medalists
Medalists at the 2013 Summer Universiade
20th-century Moldovan people
21st-century Moldovan people